Giorgi Vladimirovich Sitchinava (born 15 September 1944 in Gagra) is a retired Soviet football player.

Honours
 Soviet Top League winner: 1964.

International career
Sichinava made his debut for USSR on 22 November 1964 in a friendly against Yugoslavia. He played at the 1966 FIFA World Cup, where USSR made it to the semi-finals.

External links
  Profile

1944 births
Living people
People from Gagra District
Footballers from Abkhazia
Soviet footballers
Soviet Union international footballers
Footballers from Georgia (country)
1966 FIFA World Cup players
FC Dinamo Tbilisi players
Soviet Top League players
Association football midfielders